Cēzars Ozers (born 11 February 1937) is a retired Soviet and Latvian basketball player. He played as a point guard. Ozers won a silver medal at the 1960 Summer Olympics.

References 

1937 births
Living people
Basketball players from Riga
Latvian men's basketball players
Soviet men's basketball players
Olympic basketball players of the Soviet Union
Olympic silver medalists for the Soviet Union
Basketball players at the 1960 Summer Olympics
Point guards
Olympic medalists in basketball
Medalists at the 1960 Summer Olympics